The Last Unicorn is a 1982 American animated fantasy film about a unicorn who, upon learning that she is the last of her species on Earth, goes on a quest to find out what has happened to others of her kind. Based on the 1968 novel The Last Unicorn written by Peter S. Beagle, who also wrote the film's screenplay, the film was directed and produced by Arthur Rankin Jr. and Jules Bass. It was produced by Rankin/Bass Productions for ITC Entertainment and animated by Topcraft.

The film includes the voices of Alan Arkin, Jeff Bridges, Mia Farrow, Angela Lansbury, and Christopher Lee. The soundtrack was composed and arranged by Jimmy Webb, and songs were performed by the group America and the London Symphony Orchestra, with additional vocals provided by Lucy Mitchell. The film grossed $6.5 million in the United States.

Plot 
A female unicorn learns from two hunters and a butterfly that she is the last of her kind since a malevolent entity called the Red Bull has herded unicorns to the ends of the earth. The Unicorn journeys to find them.

The Unicorn is captured by the witch Mommy Fortuna and displayed in her Midnight Carnival. Most of the attractions are normal animals enhanced by illusions to appear as mythical beasts. Fortuna uses a spell to create another horn on the unicorn's head, as the carnival visitors cannot see her real form. Fortuna keeps the immortal harpy Celaeno captive as well, deeming the risk secondary to the deed's prestige. The unicorn is befriended by Schmendrick, an incompetent magician in the service of Mommy Fortuna. With the help of Schmendrick, the Unicorn escapes, in the process freeing Celaeno, who kills Fortuna. The Unicorn and Schmendrick gain a second traveling companion with Molly Grue, the careworn lover of Captain Cully (the disappointing reality behind the myth of Robin Hood).

When the Unicorn nears the seaside castle of King Haggard, keeper of the Red Bull, she encounters the beast, a monstrous fire elemental. Before she can be captured, Schmendrick uses his unpredictable magic, transforming her into a woman. The Red Bull loses interest in her and departs, but the Unicorn is shocked by the sensation of mortality. Schmendrick promises to return her to normal after the quest is complete.

Schmendrick, Molly Grue, and the now-human Unicorn proceed to the castle. Haggard is at first unwelcoming. Schmendrick introduces the Unicorn as Lady Amalthea, and requests that they become members of Haggard's court, only to be told that the only occupants of the castle are Haggard, his adopted son Prince Lír and four ancient men-at-arms. Haggard consents to lodge the trio, replacing his more competent wizard, Mabruk, with Schmendrick, and setting Molly Grue to work in his scullery. Mabruk leaves after recognizing "Amalthea" for what she truly is, jeering that by allowing her into his castle Haggard has invited his doom. Due to her new human emotions, Amalthea begins forgetting her true self and falls in love with Prince Lír, and considers abandoning her quest in favor of mortal love. Haggard confronts Amalthea, hinting at the location of the unicorns, yet from the waning magic in her eyes, has doubts regarding his suspicions that she is more than she seems.

Molly finally learns the location of the Red Bull's lair from the castle's cat. Molly, Schmendrick, and Amalthea are joined by Lír as they enter the bull's den, and are trapped there by Haggard. Schmendrick explains to Lír what they are looking for and reveals Amalthea's true identity. Lír declares that he loves her anyway. This makes Amalthea want to abandon the quest and marry Lír, but Lír dissuades her. The Red Bull appears, no longer deceived by Amalthea's human form, and chases after her. Schmendrick turns Amalthea back into the Unicorn, but she is unwilling to leave Lír's side. The Bull begins driving her toward the ocean just as he had driven the other unicorns. Lír tries defending her, but is killed by the Bull. Enraged, the Unicorn turns on the Bull and forces him into the sea. As the beast is engulfed by the water, the missing hundreds of unicorns emerge from the raging sea, carried on the incoming tides. With their release, Haggard's castle collapses into the sea, and Haggard, watching all from the battlements, falls to his death.

On the beach, the Unicorn magically revives Lír before she leaves him. Schmendrick assures Lír he gained much by winning the love of a unicorn, even if he is now alone. The Unicorn later says goodbye to Schmendrick, who laments he wronged her by burdening her with regret and the taint of mortality, which could make her unable to properly rejoin her kind. She disagrees about the importance of his actions, as they had helped restore unicorns to the world and made her experience regret and love. Schmendrick and Molly watch the Unicorn depart for her forest home.

Voice cast 
 Mia Farrow as the Unicorn/Lady Amalthea, the eponymous "last unicorn" who, in her search for the other unicorns, is transformed into a young woman and learns about regret and love.
 Alan Arkin as Schmendrick, a magician who accompanies the Unicorn on her quest to find others like her. Beagle commented that he was a bit "disappointed" by the way Arkin approached the character because it seemed "too flat".
 Jeff Bridges as Prince Lír, King Haggard's adopted son who falls in love with Lady Amalthea. Although he is later told by Schmendrick that she is a unicorn, his feelings for her remain unchanged, as he says emphatically, "I love whom I love".
 Tammy Grimes as Molly Grue, the love of Captain Cully who joins Schmendrick and the Unicorn. While explaining that there was no particular reason that he did not write a detailed background for Molly Grue's character, Beagle stated that he has "always been grateful" to Grimes because she "brought such vocal life to the character that she covered things I didn't do."
 Robert Klein as The Butterfly, the creature that gives the Unicorn a hint as to where to find the other unicorns.
 Angela Lansbury as Mommy Fortuna, a witch who uses her illusory magic to run the Midnight Carnival, which showcases mythical creatures that are, in truth, just normal animals. Later, the harpy Celaeno, one of the two real mythical creatures, kills her and her henchman, Ruhk.
 Christopher Lee as King Haggard, the ruler of a dreary kingdom, who has never been happy, save for when he looks at unicorns. Beagle described Lee as "the last of the great 20th Century actors, and either the most-literate or second-most literate performer I've ever met." When Lee came in to work, he brought his own copy of the novel wherein he took note of lines that he believed should not be omitted. Lee, who was fluent in German, also voiced Haggard in the German dub of the film.
 Keenan Wynn as Captain Cully, the leader of a group of bandits. 
 Wynn also voices The Harpy Celaeno, a real harpy that was captured by Mommy Fortuna, freed by the Unicorn, and kills Mommy Fortuna and Ruhk out of vengeance for trapping her. 
 Paul Frees as Mabruk, King Haggard's court magician who is replaced by Schmendrick.
 Frees also voices the Cat, an old cat who gives Molly hints on finding the Red Bull.
 Don Messick as Additional Voices
 Nellie Bellflower as the Tree, a tree that speaks and falls in love with Schmendrick after he casts the wrong spell on it.
 René Auberjonois as the Skull that guards the clock that serves as an entryway into the Red Bull's lair. Beagle praised Auberjonois' performance, saying "he could have played any role in that movie and I would have been happy ... He's that talented."
 Brother Theodore as Ruhk, a hunchback who works for Mommy Fortuna. He, along with Mommy Fortuna, is killed by the Harpy Celaeno.
 Edward Peck as Jack Jingly, Cully's Men
 Jack Lester as Hunter #1, Old Farmer, Cully's Men
 Kenneth Jennings as Hunter #2, Cully's Men

Production 
Peter S. Beagle stated that there had been interest in creating a film based on the book early on. Those who expressed interest included Lee Mendelson and Bill Melendez of the Peanuts television specials, though Beagle had been convinced by one of their partners' wives that they were "not good enough", as well as former 20th Century Fox animator Les Goldman. At the time, Beagle believed that "animated was the only way to go" with regard to the film, and had never thought of making it into a live-action film. Arthur Rankin, Jr. and Jules Bass' New York-based production company, Rankin/Bass Productions, had been the last studio that the film's associate producer, Michael Chase Walker, approached, and Beagle was first "horrified" when he was informed that they had made a deal with Walker. Beagle stated that he has since "…come to feel that the film is actually a good deal more than I had originally credited", and went on to say "There is some lovely design work – the Japanese artists who did the concepts and coloring were very good. And the voice actors do a superb job in bringing my characters to life…"

While Rankin/Bass provided the film's dialogue and story based on Beagle's work, the animation was done at Topcraft in Tokyo, Japan, headed by former Toei Animation employee Toru Hara, with Masaki Iizuka being in charge of the production. The studio, which previously animated Frosty's Winter Wonderland (1976), The Hobbit (1977), The Stingiest Man in Town (1978), The Return of the King (1980) and other cel-animated projects from Rankin/Bass, would later be hired by Hayao Miyazaki to work on Nausicaä of the Valley of the Wind, and their core members eventually went on to form Studio Ghibli. According to Beagle, the final film ended up being "remarkably close" to his original script, although one scene at the end involving an encounter with a princess was "animated but eventually cut."

Soundtrack 

The musical score and the songs were composed and arranged by Jimmy Webb, and performed by the group America and the London Symphony Orchestra, with additional vocals provided by Lucy Mitchell. The Last Unicorn soundtrack was recorded at De Lane Lea Studios in Wembley, England in 1982. The album was released in Germany in 1983 by Virgin Records, but has not been released in the United States; it includes the film score's symphonic pieces. In his review for AllMusic, James Christopher Monger called it, "an appropriately somber and sentimental blend of fairy tale motifs and dark, Wagnerian cues".

The theme song is featured on the 1997 compilation album The Best of America.

Release 
U.S. distribution rights were sold to Jensen Farley when Universal Pictures, who were due to release Associated Film Distribution's product (including ITC) in the United States, were not keen on the film.

The Last Unicorn premiered in 648 theaters in the United States on November 19, 1982, and earned $2,250,000 on its opening weekend. It grossed a total of $6,455,330 in the U.S. and Canada.

Home media 
The first U.S. DVD, released by Family Home Entertainment on March 16, 2004, was made from poor-quality pan-and-scan masters. The company's owner, Lionsgate, later licensed the German video masters and audio mix and came up with a "25th Anniversary Edition" DVD which was released in North America on February 6, 2007. It has audio and visual quality superior to the original U.S. release, and is in 16:9 widescreen format, but has several swear words edited out, and as a result of being taken from PAL masters, plays 4% faster than the original film, resulting in a slightly higher audio pitch than normal. The new DVD edition includes a featurette with an interview with the author, as well as a set-top game, image gallery, and the original theatrical trailer. As of October 2011, over 2,500,000 copies of the DVD have been sold. A Blu-ray edition of the film was released by Lionsgate on February 22, 2011; this release was sourced from a new transfer of the theatrical cut of the film, thus restoring the swearing and correcting the PAL speed-up issue, though the 25th Anniversary Edition was still included as an option on this release.

On June 9, 2015, Shout! Factory released new Blu-ray and DVD versions of The Last Unicorn entitled "The Enchanted Edition". This edition was transferred from a new widescreen 2K digital master, and includes the original uncensored audio as well as a commentary track with Peter S. Beagle, associate producer Michael Chase Walker, tour producer Connor Freff Cochran, and Conlan Press team members; highlights from the Worldwide Screening Tour; a new True Magic: The Story of the Last Unicorn featurette; animated storyboards; and the original theatrical trailer.

In the United Kingdom, ITV Studios Global Entertainment hold complete ownership of the film via their acquisition of ITC's entire feature film library, not including those released by Embassy Pictures, which are held by StudioCanal. Since 2009, ITV have been responsible for all home media releases of The Last Unicorn.

The film was available on The Criterion Channel.

Reception and legacy
, the film has  rating on Rotten Tomatoes from  reviews. The site's critical consensus reads: "The Last Unicorn lacks the fluid animation to truly sparkle as an animated epic, but offbeat characters and an affecting storytelling make it one of a kind for the true believers."

In a New York Times review, Janet Maslin called The Last Unicorn "an unusual children's film in many respects, the chief one being that it is unusually good [... and which] features a cast that would do any live-action film proud, a visual style noticeably different from that of other children's fare, and a story filled with genuine sweetness and mystery." Regarding the ending she said, "no one of any age will be immune to the sentiment of the film's final moments, which really are unexpectedly touching and memorable".

Todd McCarthy in Variety praised the script and voice acting but was unimpressed by the film's animation. "However vapid the unicorn may appear to the eye, Mia Farrow's voice brings an almost moving plaintive quality to the character. For an actress to register so strongly on voice alone is a rare accomplishment." The review also praised the vocal talents of Arkin, Lee, and Frees.

Colin Greenland reviewed The Last Unicorn for Imagine magazine, and stated that "Beagle has kept all the good bits, including the jokes, the smart, wry dialogue, and many bursts of brilliant imagination, here captured in stylish special effects: the attack of the Red Bull, all made of fire; the binding of all the lost unicorns into the foam of the sea."

The Ridley Scott's cult classic Legend (1985) shares several commonalities with The Last Unicorn, including a red horned antagonist.

Beagle himself called the film "magnificent" in comparison to J.R.R. Tolkien's The Lord of the Rings, for which he also wrote the screenplay.

The film has since maintained a cult following.  In 2003, the Online Film Critics Society ranked the film as the 96th greatest animated film of all time.

References

External links 

 
 
 
 
 
 
 The Last Unicorn FAQ

1982 films
1982 animated films
1982 fantasy films
American children's animated adventure films
American children's animated fantasy films
American fantasy adventure films
American independent films
Films directed by Jules Bass
Films directed by Arthur Rankin Jr.
Animated films based on novels
1980s children's fantasy films
Films based on fantasy novels
Films about depression
Films about unicorns
Films set in Europe
Films set in Ireland
Topcraft
ITC Entertainment films
1980s American animated films
Rankin/Bass Productions films
Films based on American novels
Films about witchcraft
Films about wizards
Cultural depictions of Harpies
1980s children's animated films
Unicorns
1980s English-language films